Public transport in L'Hospitalet de Llobregat is operated by several companies, most of which are part of the Autoritat del Transport Metropolità, a transport authority managing services in the metropolitan area of Barcelona. L'Hospitalet is located immediately to the west of Barcelona's Sants-Montjuïc and Les Corts districts, meaning transit between the two cities is quite straightforward, even though it was not fully implemented until late. This article intends to list the different transportation services within limits of the municipality of L'Hospitalet.

Barcelona Metro stations
Stations under construction are listed in italics.

Rodalies Barcelona stations

Trambaix stations
Tram stations within L'Hospitalet.

Day bus lines

Intermunicipal buses
L10.-El Prat-L'Hospitalet-Cornellà-Esplugues-St. Joan Despí-St. Just Desvern-St. Feliu
L11.-L'Hospitalet-Cornellà-St. Joan Despí
L12.-Cornellà-L'Hospitalet-Barcelona
L14.-L'Hospitalet-Barcelona
L16.-L'Hospitalet-Barcelona
L52.-L'Hospitalet-Cornellà-St. Joan Despí-St. Feliu
L70.-St. Boi-El Prat-L'Hospitalet-Barcelona
L72.-St. Boi-El Prat-L'Hospitalet-Barcelona
L80.-Gavà-Viladecans-El Prat-L'Hospitalet-Barcelona
L82.-Gavà-Viladecans-St. Boi-Cornellà-L'Hospitalet
L85.-Gavà-Viladecans-St. Boi-Cornellà-L'Hospitalet
L86.-Viladecans-St. Boi-El Prat-L'Hospitalet-Barcelona
L94.-Castelldefels-Gavà-El Prat-L'Hospitalet-Barcelona
L95.-Castelldefels-Gavà-El Prat-L'Hospitalet-Barcelona

Autobusos de Barcelona
Operated by Autobusos de Barcelona.
H12.-L'Hospitalet-Barcelona
V1.-L'Hospitalet-Barcelona
46.-Aeroport-L'Hospitalet-Barcelona
65.-El Prat-L'Hospitalet-Barcelona
79.-L'Hospitalet-Barcelona
157.-St. Joan Despí-St. Just Desvern-Esplugues-L'Hospitalet

L'Hospitalet-only buses
Operated by Rosanbus.
L'H1
L'H2

Night bus lines
 N2.-L'Hospitalet-Barcelona-St. Adrià-Badalona
 N13.-St. Boi-Cornellà-L'Hospitalet-Barcelona
 N14.-Castelldefels-Gavà-Viladecans-St. Boi-Cornellà-Esplugues-L'Hospitalet-Barcelona
 N15.-St. Joan Despí-Cornellà-L'Hospitalet-Barcelona
 N16.-Castelldefels-Gavà-Viladecans-L'Hospitalet-Barcelona
 N17.-Aeroport-El Prat-L'Hospitalet-Barcelona
 N18.-Aeroport-L'Hospitalet-Barcelona

Coach stations
L'Hospitalet de Llobregat coach station is located near Santa Eulàlia metro station, at 33 Carrer de Santa Eulàlia (08902).

Transport in the municipalities of Barcelonès
Transport in Badalona
Transport in Barcelona
Transport in Sant Adrià de Besòs
Transport in Santa Coloma de Gramenet

Transport in other municipalities of the Metropolitan Area
Transport in Castelldefels
Transport in Cornellà de Llobregat
Transport in Esplugues de Llobregat
Transport in Gavà
Transport in Montcada i Reixac
Transport in Sant Boi de Llobregat
Transport in Sant Cugat del Vallès
Transport in Sant Feliu de Llobregat
Transport in Sant Joan Despí
Transport in Sant Just Desvern
Transport in Viladecans

See also
Autoritat del Transport Metropolità

References

External links
Ciutat.net